Bibliography of fantasy writer Richard Parks:

Series

Yamada no Goji

Novels
Yamada Monogatari: To Break the Demon Gate (2014)
Yamada Monogatari: The War God's Son (2015)
Yamada Monogatari: The Emperor in Shadow (2016)

Collections
Yamada Monogatari: Demon Hunter (collection, 2013)
Yamada Monogatari: Troubled Spirits (collection, 2022)

Short stories
"Foxtails" (2005 – collected in Worshipping Small Gods (2007) and Yamada Monogatari: Demon Hunter (2013))
"Moon Viewing at Shijo Bridge (2006 – collected in On the Banks of the River of Heaven (2010) and Yamada Monogatari: Demon Hunter (2013))
"A Touch of Hell" (2007 – collected in Yamada Monogatari: Demon Hunter (2013))
"Hot Water" (2007 – collected in Yamada Monogatari: Demon Hunter (2013))
"The River of Three Crossings" (2009 – collected in Yamada Monogatari: Demon Hunter (2013))
"The Mansion of Bones" (2009 – collected in Yamada Monogatari: Demon Hunter (2013))
"Sanji's Demon" (2010 – collected in Yamada Monogatari: Demon Hunter (2013))
"Lady of the Ghost Willow" (2010 – collected in Yamada Monogatari: Demon Hunter (2013))
"The Ghost of Shinoda Forest" (2011 – collected in Yamada Monogatari: Demon Hunter (2013))
"The Tiger's Turn" (2011 - collected in Yamada Monogatari: Troubled Spirits (2022))
"Three Little Foxes" (2012 - collected in Yamada Monogatari: Troubled Spirits (2022))
"The Bride Doll" (2013 – collected in Yamada Monogatari: Demon Hunter (2013))
"The Sorrow of Rain" (2014 - collected in Yamada Monogatari: Troubled Spirits (2022)) 
"Uzumaki of the Lake" (2020 - collected in Yamada Monogatari: Troubled Spirits (2022))
"A Minor Exorcism" (2020 - collected in Yamada Monogatari: Troubled Spirits (2022))
"The Fox's Daughter" (2021 - collected in Yamada Monogatari: Troubled Spirits (2022))
"The Ame Onna" (2022 - collected in Yamada Monogatari: Troubled Spirits (2022))
"One Rainy Day, With Spirits" (2022 - collected in Yamada Monogatari: Troubled Spirits (2022))

The Laws of Power

Novels
The Long Look (2008) 
Black Kath's Daughter (2012)
Power's Shadow (2015)
The Seventh Law of Power (forthcoming)

Collections
The Collected Tymon the Black (2017)

Short stories
"What Power Holds" (1994 – incorporated in Black Kath's Daughter (2012))
"The Third Law of Power" (1995 – incorporated in Black Kath's Daughter (2012))
"A Time for Heroes" (1996 – collected in Worshipping Small Gods (2007) and The Collected Tymon the Black (2017); incorporated in The Long Look (2008))
"The 4th Law of Power" (2000 – incorporated in Power's Shadow (2015))
"The First Law of Power" (2001 – incorporated in Black Kath's Daughter (2012))
"Empty Places" (2005 – collected in The Collected Tymon the Black (2017))
"The Devil of Details" (2008 – collected in The Collected Tymon the Black (2017))

Eli Mothersbaugh

Collections
Ghost Trouble: The Casefiles of Eli Mothersbaugh (collection, 2013)

Short stories
"Wrecks" (1998 – collected in The Ogre's Wife (2002) and Ghost Trouble (2013))
"The God of Children" (2000 – collected in The Ogre's Wife (2002) and Ghost Trouble (2013))
"A Respectful Silence" (2001 – collected in The Ogre's Wife (2002) and Ghost Trouble (2013))
"A Hint of Jasmine" (2004 – collected in Worshipping Small Gods (2007) and Ghost Trouble (2013))
"Voices in an Empty Room" (2004 – collected in Worshipping Small Gods (2007) and Ghost Trouble (2013))
"Hanagan's Kiyomatsu, 1923" (2007 – collected in Worshipping Small Gods (2007) and Ghost Trouble (2013))
"Diva" (2007 – collected in Worshipping Small Gods (2007) and Ghost Trouble (2013))
"Beacons" (2011 – collected in Ghost Trouble (2013))
"Muramasa's Rage" (2011 – collected in Ghost Trouble (2013))
"His Hour Upon the Stage" (2011 – collected in Ghost Trouble (2013))
"Souvenirs" (2011 – collected in Ghost Trouble (2013))
"The Missing Ghost" (2011 – collected in Ghost Trouble (2013))

Errant Fae

Collections
Tales From the Black Dog (2020)

Novellas and short stories
Little Fire and Fog (2019)
"Neutral Ground" (2020 - collected in Tales From the Black Dog (2020))
"Hair of the Black Dog" (2020 - collected in Tales From the Black Dog (2020))
"Contingency Plan" (2020 - collected in Tales From the Black Dog (2020))
"Well, Something Ever After" (2020 - collected in Tales From the Black Dog (2020))
"A Sense of Humor" (2020 - collected in Tales From the Black Dog (2020))
"A Good Pair of Shoes" (2020 - collected in Tales From the Black Dog (2020))
"Evening With a Drunken Muse" (2020 - collected in Tales From the Black Dog (2020))
"A Drink With Friends" (2020 - collected in Tales From the Black Dog (2020))
"Heather Brew" (2020 - collected in Tales From the Black Dog (2020))
"Where No One Knows Your Name" (2020 - collected in Tales From the Black Dog (2020))
"Star Light, Star Bright" (2020 - collected in Tales From the Black Dog (2020))

Somna's World

Novels
A Warrior of Dreams (2011)

Short stories
"Laying the Stones" (1994 – incorporated in A Warrior of Dreams (2011))
"The Man Who Carved Skulls" (2007 – collected in On the Banks of the River of Heaven (2010))
"Courting the Lady Scythe" (2008 – collected in On the Banks of the River of Heaven (2010))

Pan Bao and Jing

Short stories
"In Memory of Jianhong, Snake-Devil" (2017)
"On the Road to the Hell of Hungry Ghosts" (2017)
"An Account of the Madness of the Magistrate, Chengdhu Village" (2018)

Bergstryker U.

Collections
Bergstryker U: Where Monsters and Humans Mingle (collection, 2020)

Novellas
The Face of an Angel (as W. J. Everett) (2011 - collected in Bergstryker U (2020))
The Voice of a Demon (as W. J. Everett) (2014 - collected in Bergstryker U (2020))

Other novels

Spirits of Wood and Stone (2011)
The Blood Red Scarf (2011)
The Ghost War (2012)
All the Gates of Hell (2013)

Other collections

The Ogre's Wife: Fairy Tales For Grownups (2002)
Worshipping Small Gods (2007)
On the Banks of the River of Heaven (2010)
Our Lady of 47 Ursae Majoris (2011)
The Devil Has His Due (2012)
Two for Christmas (2013)
The God of Small Troubles and Other Stories (2014)
Tales From the Black Dog (2020)
Fairy Tale Flash (2020)

Other separately published short works

Hereafter, and After (2007)
Four Horsemen, at Their Leisure (2011)
The Heavenly Fox (2011)
A Hint of Evil (2012)
In the Realm of Legend (2016)
In the Palace of the Jade Lion (2020)

Other short stories

"Sessinahn" (1979)
"Echoes" (1979) (as B. Richard Parks)
"Quest of the Eldbrand" (1981)
"The Passing" (1981) (as Rick Parks)
"Big Ears" (1985) (as B. Richard Parks)
"Daughter of the Heartwood" (1987 – incorporated in The Ghost War (2012)) (as Rick Parks)
"Ghostcaller" (1994)
"Simple Souls" (1994)
"Coffin.Nail" (1995)
"Notes from the Bridge" (1995)
"Quiet, Please" (1995 – incorporated in The Blood Red Scarf (2011))
"Revival" (1995)
"The Last Waltz" (1995)
"The Ogre's Wife" (1995 – collected in The Ogre's Wife (2002))
"They Call Him King" (1995)
"Eucharist" (1997 – collected in Our Lady of 47 Ursae Majoris (2011))
"Knacker Man" (1997)
"Poppa's Children" (1997 – collected in Our Lady of 47 Ursae Majoris (2011))
"The Right Sort of Flea" (1997)
"My Lord Teaser" (1997 – collected in The Ogre's Wife (2002))
"A Thing or Two About Love" (1997)
"Lord Madoc and the Red Knight" (1997)
"Idle Conversation at the End of the World" (1998)
"Beauty of Things Unseen" (1999 – collected in The Ogre's Wife (2002))
"Doppels" (1999 – collected in The Ogre's Wife (2002))
"Take a Long Step" (1999 – collected in The Ogre's Wife (2002))
"Thy Golden Stair" (1999)
"Borrowed Lives" (1999 – collected in The Ogre's Wife (2002))
"How Konti Scrounged the World" (2000 – collected in The Ogre's Wife (2002))
"Crows" (2000 – collected in Our Lady of 47 Ursae Majoris (2011))
"Judgment Day" (2000 – collected in The Ogre's Wife (2002))
"Golden Bell, Seven, and the Marquis of Zeng" (2000 – collected in The Ogre's Wife (2002))
"A Place to Begin" (2001 – collected in The Ogre's Wife (2002))
"The Trickster's Wife" (2001 – collected in The Ogre's Wife (2002))
"Keeping Lalande Station" (2001 – collected in Our Lady of 47 Ursae Majoris (2011))
"Kallisti" (2002 – collected in Worshipping Small Gods (2007))
"Doing Time in the Wild Hunt" (2002)
"The End of the Dance, the Beginning" (2002)
"Punishment" (2002 – collected in Our Lady of 47 Ursae Majoris (2011))
"Some Archival Material on the 2198 Stellar Expedition" (2002 – collected in Our Lady of 47 Ursae Majoris (2011))
"The Plum Blossom Lantern" (2003 – collected in Worshipping Small Gods (2007))
"Worshipping Small Gods" (2003 – collected in Worshipping Small Gods (2007))
"Yamabushi" (2003 – collected in Worshipping Small Gods (2007))
"The Great Big Out" (2004 – collected in Our Lady of 47 Ursae Majoris (2011))
"The Right God" (2004 – collected in Worshipping Small Gods (2007))
"Lord Goji's Wedding" (2005 – collected in On the Banks of the River of Heaven (2010))
"Death, the Devil, and the Lady in White" (2005 – collected in Worshipping Small Gods (2007))
"The Penultimate Riddle" (2005 – collected in Worshipping Small Gods (2007))
"The Finer Points of Destruction" (2005 – collected in On the Banks of the River of Heaven (2010))
"The Last Romantic" (2006)
"Another Kind of Glamour" (2006)
"Subversion Clause" (2006 – collected in The Devil Has His Due (2012))
"Brillig" (2006 – collected in On the Banks of the River of Heaven (2010))
"Conversation in the Tomb of an Unknown King" (2006)
"A Pinch of Salt" (2006 – collected in On the Banks of the River of Heaven (2010))
"A Garden in Hell" (2006 – collected in On the Banks of the River of Heaven (2010))
"Directional Drift" (2007 – collected in Our Lady of 47 Ursae Majoris (2011))
"Wizard of Wasted Time" (2007 – collected in Worshipping Small Gods (2007))
"On the Wheel" (2008 – collected in On the Banks of the River of Heaven (2010))
"On the Banks of the River of Heaven" (2008 – collected in On the Banks of the River of Heaven (2010))
"Our Lady of 47 Ursae Majoris" (2008 – collected in Our Lady of 47 Ursae Majoris (2011))
"Skin Deep" (2008 – collected in On the Banks of the River of Heaven (2010))
"A Road Once Traveled" (2009)
"Night, in Dark Perfection" (2009)
"The White Bone Fan" (2009)
"One Lone Mountain, Shining White" (2010)
"The Queen's Reason" (2010)
"Four Horsemen, at Their Leisure" (2010)
"Signs Along the Road" (2010 – collected in Our Lady of 47 Ursae Majoris (2011))
"Soft as Spider Silk" (2010 – collected in On the Banks of the River of Heaven (2010))
"The Feather Cloak" (2010 – collected in On the Banks of the River of Heaven (2010))
"The Twa Corbies, Revisited" (2010 – collected in On the Banks of the River of Heaven (2010))
"Drowning My Sorrows" (2011)
"The Swan Troika" (2011)
"Passing Zero Point" (2011 – collected in Our Lady of 47 Ursae Majoris (2011))
"In the Palace of the Jade Lion" (2012 - revised ebook version 2020)
"Closing Time" (2012 – collected in The Devil Has His Due (2012))
"Miss Jean Takes a Walk" (2012)
"One Blissful Night at the Inferno Lounge" (2012 – collected in The Devil Has His Due (2012))
"Boiling the Frog" (2012 – collected in The Devil Has His Due (2012))
"Sidney's Cotton" (2013)
"Beach Bum and the Drowned Girl" (2013)
"Cherry Blossoms on the River of Souls" (2013)
"Cold Christmas" (2013 – collected in Two for Christmas (2013))
"Have a Good Day" (2013 – collected in Two for Christmas (2013))
"The Manor of Lost Time" (2014)
"The God of Small Troubles" (2014 – collected in The God of Small Troubles (2014))
"Anchors and Sails" (2014 – collected in The God of Small Troubles (2014))
"Olam Drexler's School for Exceptional Children" (2014 – collected in The God of Small Troubles (2014))
"Small Deaths" (2014 – collected in The God of Small Troubles (2014))
"Miss Jean Takes a Walk" (2014 – collected in The God of Small Troubles (2014))
"The Cat of Five Virtues" (2017)
"Salt of the Earth" (2017)
"Drowning My Sorrows" (2017)
"Crack'd From Side to Side" (2017)
"The Queen of Diamonds" (2017)
"Ugly Puppies" (2017)
"The Arrangement" (2018)
"The Funambulist" (2018)
"Could be Worse" (2018)
"A Matter of Vision" (2018)
"The Fourth Apprentice" (2018)
"Legends of the Singing River" (2018)
"Beauty, Wide Awake" (2018 – collected in Fairy Tale Flash (2020))
"A Mother's Love" (2018 – collected in Fairy Tale Flash (2020))
"The Testament of the Goat Troll" (2019 – collected in Fairy Tale Flash (2020))
"The Professional" (2019)
"The ComeUp Pence" (2019)
"It's a Puzzle" (2020)
"Liminal Conversation" (2020)
"Invasive Species" (2020)
"Subject to Interpretation" (2020)
"Another Fairy Tale" (2020 – collected in Fairy Tale Flash (2020))
"The Changeling, Part 1" (2020 – collected in Fairy Tale Flash (2020))
"The Changeling, Part 2" (2020 – collected in Fairy Tale Flash (2020))
"Drink to Me" (2020)
"Mostly True Thomas" (2020 – collected in Fairy Tale Flash (2020))
"Consider the Possibility" (2020 – collected in Fairy Tale Flash (2020))
"The Giant's Heart" (2020 – collected in Fairy Tale Flash (2020))
"Learning the Rules" (2020 – collected in Fairy Tale Flash (2020))
"Spelling Danger" (2020 – collected in Fairy Tale Flash (2020))
"My Favorite" (2020 – collected in Fairy Tale Flash (2020))
"Seeking Fortune" (2020 – collected in Fairy Tale Flash (2020))
"Shiny Rocks" (2020 – collected in Fairy Tale Flash (2020))
"Superfluous" (2020 – collected in Fairy Tale Flash (2020))
"On the Night Shore" (2020 – collected in Fairy Tale Flash (2020))
"The Fourth Meeting" (2020 – collected in Fairy Tale Flash (2020))
"Only a Mother" (2020 – collected in Fairy Tale Flash (2020))
"The Stowaway" (2020 – collected in Fairy Tale Flash (2020))
"The Borrowed Fife" (2020 – collected in Fairy Tale Flash (2020))
"Contemplating Forever" (2021)
"Lapis Philosophorum" (2021)
"Royal Dilemma" (2021)

References

 
Bibliographies by writer
Bibliographies of American writers
Fantasy bibliographies
Horror fiction bibliographies
Science fiction bibliographies